Siwaiyaan is a Pakistani telefilm that released on Eid ul Fitr 2022 on ARY Digital. It is directed by Bilal Atif Khan in his directorial debut who also wrote the film. It stars Sonya Hussyn and Yasir Hussain in leading roles.

Plot 

The telefilm revolves around a household where wife mistakenly kills a person and then tries to hide the dead body with the aid of her husband from the guests who have come for Eid greetings.

Cast 

 Sonya Hussyn 
 Yasir Hussain as Ahsan
 Nayyar Ejaz
 Saife Hassan 
 Zeba Shehnaz as Ahsan's grandmother
 Hina Rizvi as Rani

Production 

The telefilm is the debut of Bilal Atif Khan as a director and writer. The film is produced by Big Bang Entertainment. Hussain revealed in conservation with DAWN Images that script is heavily inspired by Ray Cooney's work.

References 

Pakistani drama films
2020s Urdu-language films